Sweet Talker may refer to:

 Sweet Talker (film), 1991
 Sweet Talker (soundtrack), the film's accompanying soundtrack album
 Sweet Talker (Jessie J album), 2014, or the title song
 Sweet Talker (EP), a 2010 EP by Like Moths to Flames
 "Sweet Talker" (song), a song by Years & Years and Galantis from Night Call
 "Sweet Talker", a song by Carly Rae Jepsen from Tug of War
 "Sweet Talker", a song by Janice Vidal from My Love
 "Sweet Talker", a song by Whitesnake from Ready an' Willing